Sultan Mehmud Khurd was the last ruler of the sarkar of Pakhli in Hazara, Pakistan. One of his brothers, Sultan Qiassuddin, was Wali-e-Tanawal, and the Wali-e-Upper Tanawal was Sultan Sahwaj. His brother, Sultan Muqarrab, was Wali-e-Dhamtor.

History
Sultan Maqarrab revolted against Sultan Mehmud Khud, and was defeated by the Delhi Sultanate. This incident weakened the Turks.

Pakhli had two important governments: one between Battagram and Thakot ruled by Shamsher Khan and the other of Kashmir was ruled by Sultan Kamal. Both of the rulers were close relatives of Turkish rulers of Pakhli.

In 1713, Sultan Khurd went to Delhi. One of the Sultan's daughters was married to Syed Jalal Baba, who took advantage of Khurd's absence to invite the Swatis to invade Pakhli. The conspiracy succeeded. Shamsher Khan, a general loyal to Khurd, resisted at the Jhanjal fort of Thakot. After a siege of several months, Baba's forces defeated Shamsher Khan, who was killed in combat.

After the fall of Jhanjer, there was no resistance; due to the ages of the Sultan's sons and the conspiracy of Baba, the Turks could not offer resistance. Swatis entered Hazara, pushing the Turks into the areas of Hazara and Kashmir. The Turks retained small jagirs and have never been fully eliminated from the locations. They settled in Behali of the Mansehra District, and in Mankrai of the Haripur District. Pakhli was the only state in India which retained its independence; Mughals exempted the citizens from paying taxes.

Pakistani royalty